The following is a list of Pacific typhoon seasons from 1902 to 1919. Data from these years was extremely unreliable, so there were many more typhoons that did not hit land and were not detected by ships.

Pacific typhoon seasons

1900, 1901, 1902–1919, 1920–1938, 1939

1902

In 1902, there were 24 tropical cyclones in the western Pacific Ocean.

1300 people were killed by a typhoon in Japan on September.

1903

In 1903, there were 31 tropical cyclones in the western Pacific Ocean that were detected by ships or ground stations nearby.

1904

In 1904, there were 31 tropical cyclones in the western Pacific Ocean.

From September 7–12, a typhoon left at least 4,000 fatalities in Vietnam.

1905

In 1905, there were 24 tropical cyclones in the western Pacific Ocean.

On April 20, a typhoon struck the Marshall Islands, killing 26 people. On June 30, another typhoon moved through the Marshall Islands, killing 230 people.

From September 21–29, a typhoon moved across the Philippines, killing more than 240 people.

1906

In 1906, there were 24 tropical cyclones in the western Pacific Ocean.

In September 1906, a typhoon struck China near Hong Kong, killing around 15,000 people, and causing US$20 million in damage.

1907

In 1907, there were 32 tropical cyclones in the western Pacific Ocean.

From March 26–27, a typhoon moved through the Caroline Islands, killing 473 people in the archipelago.

1908

In 1908, there were 31 tropical cyclones in the western Pacific Ocean.

A typhoon struck near Hong Kong, killing 428 people.

1909

In 1909, there were 35 tropical cyclones in the western Pacific Ocean.

The typhoon impacted Philippines and caused an instrument to be destroyed.

1910

In 1910, there were 38 tropical cyclones in the western Pacific Ocean.

1911

In 1911, there were 30 tropical cyclones in the western Pacific Ocean.

A storm was first observed south of Guam on August 21 and moved on a westward trajectory. On August 26, the track shifted more to the west-northwest, bringing it over the Batanes islands offshore northern Luzon. That night, the storm approached southwest coast of Taiwan (then known as Formosa) with great intensity, possibly moving over the island. Kaohsiung reported a minimum pressure of 937 mbar (27.63 inHg), the lowest-ever recorded pressure on the island as of 1955, as well as maximum sustained winds of 177 km/h (110 mph) before the anemometer broke. Across Taiwan, the typhoon destroyed over 30,000 houses, injured 378, and killed 305 people. The storm made landfall in eastern China on August 27 and continued northward for three more days.

1912

In 1912, there were 27 tropical cyclones in the western Pacific Ocean.

In August, a typhoon struck near Wenzhou, China, killing 50,000 people.

In September, a typhoon killed 1,000 people and left US$20 million in damage when it struck Japan.

In November, typhoon struck Tacloban, Philippines, killing 15,000 people.

Also, on November 26, a typhoon struck Palau, killing two people.

1913

In 1913, there were 23 tropical cyclones in the western Pacific Ocean.

On November 10, a typhoon hit Guam. The USS Ajax was wrecked during the storm. A hospital steward was reported to have been killed, though they were later found alive.

1914

In 1914, there were 25 tropical cyclones in the western Pacific Ocean.

1915

In 1915, there were 23 tropical cyclones in the western Pacific Ocean.

1916

In 1916, there were 23 tropical cyclones in the western Pacific Ocean.

1917

In 1917, there were 16 tropical cyclones in the western Pacific Ocean.

In September, a typhoon struck the Japanese island of Honshu, killing 4,000 people and leaving US$50 million in damage.

1918

In 1918, there were 16 tropical cyclones in the western Pacific Ocean.

In November, a typhoon killed 129 people when it struck Majuro in the Marshall Islands.

1919

In 1919, there were 26 tropical cyclones in the western Pacific Ocean.

See also
 1900–1940 South Pacific cyclone seasons
 1900–1950 South-West Indian Ocean cyclone seasons
 1900s Australian region cyclone seasons
 1910s Australian region cyclone seasons

References

Pre-1940 Pacific typhoon seasons